The knockout stage for the 2020 Thomas Cup in Aarhus, Denmark began on 15 October 2021 with the quarter-finals and ended on 17 October with the final.

Qualified teams
The top two placed teams from each of the four groups qualified for this stage.

Bracket
The draw was conducted on 14 October 2021 after the last match of the group stage.

Quarter-finals

Quarter-final 1

Quarter-final 2

Quarter-final 3

Quarter-final 4

Semi-finals

Semi-final 1

Semi-final 2

Final

References

Thomas knockout stage